Rudgea obesiflora is a species of plant in the family Rubiaceae. It is endemic to Peru and is found in lowland forests.

References

Flora of Peru
obesiflora
Vulnerable plants
Taxonomy articles created by Polbot